Laurence was Archdeacon of Armagh in 1219:  he was still in office in 1229.

Notes

13th-century Irish Roman Catholic priests
Archdeacons of Armagh